The Tacolneston transmitting station is a facility for both analogue and digital VHF/FM radio and UHF television transmission near Tacolneston,  south-west of Norwich, Norfolk, England.

History

Construction
VHF (FM) radio broadcasts began on a test basis from 22 December 1956, in order to allow East Anglia to receive programmes on VHF over the Christmas period. The BBC Light Programme was not available during this test phase, and there were warnings that the service would occasionally be interrupted for engineering reasons. The main structure was built by J. L. Eve Construction around 1956, for the new BBC East region.

Transmissions
The station began broadcasting regular programmes from Norwich purely for East Anglian audiences on the Midlands Home Service from Tuesday 5 February 1957, and the transmitter went to full power for VHF from 6.35pm on Tuesday 30 April 1957.

The transmission site is located at 52° 31' 3.9" North, 1° 8' 19.3" East (National Grid Reference: TM131958).  In July 1989, it was reported that the transmitting station cost almost £500,000 a year to run.

The current mast has an average height of 221 metres above sea level. It is now owned and operated by Arqiva, but was owned by the BBC before they privatised their transmission department prior to 1997.

Arqiva (formerly National Grid Wireless) announced, on 6 August 2007, that they plan to replace the current  mast with a new  mast in order to ensure good digital TV reception across East Anglia after digital switchover, which took place in the area in November 2011.  Arqiva also plan to replace the original transmitter hall at this site as it has now reached the end of its useful life. Work has been completed on the new structure, and for the moment there will be three structures (two masts and a lattice tower) on the site.  The old 165m mast is expected to start being dismantled in 2013.

Radio services listed by frequency

Analogue radio (FM VHF)

Digital radio (DAB)

Television services listed by frequency

Digital television
Digital transmissions became at least ten times stronger in power after the digital switchover (DSO), and their frequencies were reorganised.

At Tacolneston, extra HD muxes are being broadcast on UHF 55 and UHF 56, along with a local TV service (That's Norfolk) using an interleaved frequency on UHF 32 (QSPK 8K 3/4 8.0Mbit/s).

Before switchover

Analogue television
Tacolneston switched to digital-only television transmissions in November 2011; analogue BBC Two transmissions ceased on 9 November, and two weeks later, on 23 November 2011, the other four analogue channels ceased analogue transmissions.

See also
List of masts
List of tallest structures in the United Kingdom
List of radio stations in the United Kingdom

References

http://www.ukfree.tv/txdetail.php?a=TM131958

External links
The Transmission Gallery: photographs, coverage maps and information
Tacolneston transmitter at TheBigTower.com

Transmitter sites in England
Norfolk